Torshab-e Bala (also Romanized as Torshāb-e Bālā; also known as Torshābād-e Bālā, Torshāb Torc-ab, and Turshāb Bāla) is a village in Mashiz Rural District, in the Central District of Bardsir County, Kerman Province, Iran. At the 2006 census, its population was 10, in 9 families.

References 

Populated places in Bardsir County